Football is the most popular sport in Colombia (according to FIFA, there are 3,043,229 players total, 291,229 of which are registered and 2,752,000 are unregistered; with 2,773 clubs and 15,800 officials). The Colombian national league ranks 9th in the IFFHS's ranking The Strongest National League in the World of 2014 (3rd in South America),.

The Colombia national team represents Colombia in international football competitions. The highest rank it has ever reached in the FIFA World Rankings was third in 2013. It is currently ranked sixteenth in the world.

Among the individual notable players that have emerged from the country are René Higuita, creator of the "Scorpion kick", Carlos Valderrama, Leonel Álvarez, Faustino Asprilla, Iván Córdoba, Mario Yepes, Radamel Falcao, Juan Cuadrado and James Rodríguez. Colombian players have made an impact in the wider world game, notably in Europe in leagues like La Liga and in North America with Major League Soccer (MLS).

Colombia had its strongest period during the 1990s, where they were among the giants in world football. A match during this period in 1993 resulted in a 5–0 win over Argentina which caused a special "mutual respect" rivalry between both nations. During this era, Colombia qualified for the 1990, 1994 and 1998 editions of the World Cup, only reaching the second round in 1990. At the 2001 Copa América, Óscar Córdoba became the first and only goalkeeper in history to keep a perfect clean sheet in a Copa América tournament.

Football became an important part of the identity of Colombia as it fought the negative image of Colombia from the mid-1980s up to the present day. While Colombia has had ups and downs with the sport, football is still widely loved and supported.

History

Early years
The origins of football in Colombia is debated by many. Most historians agree that the Caribbean Region was the place where football spread. It is believed that its origins go back to 1900, by English railway engineers from The Colombia Railways Company.

The first clubs were formed in Barranquilla and Bogotá: Barranquilla FC, Polo Club, Escuela Militar and Bartolinos, although the game took a while to develop in popularity. The 1918 Campeonato Nacional was the first tournament played between Colombian clubs, followed by the Copa Centenario Batalla de Boyacá. Independiente Medellín, founded on 15 April 1913, is the oldest club that remains as a professional club.

It was not until 1924 that the Colombian Football Federation was formed, initially under the name Liga de Fútbol, that gained the affiliation with FIFA and CONMEBOL in 1936.

El Dorado
In 1948, a national league was created, known as División Mayor del Fútbol Colombiano, formed largely from the efforts of administrator Alfonso Senior Quevedo. Outside the remit of FIFA due to contract problems, the league recruited a number of leading players, such as Alfredo Di Stéfano, Neil Franklin and Charlie Mitten, and gained the nickname "El Dorado". However, the period ended in 1954 after much of the money promised to the players failed to materialise

Contemporary football
In 1968, the league followed the pattern common in South America by splitting into two separate competitions per season, the Apertura (February to June) and the Finalización (July to December). In 1991, a second division was added to the first with a third, now defunct. With 16 titles, Atlético Nacional is the team with the most trophies, followed by America de Cali and Millonarios with 15 both; All three are the most successful clubs domestically. The Copa Colombia appeared in 1950, although this knockout competition was only contested from time to time until 2008 when it became an annual tournament. Atlético Nacional is also the most successful club in this competition, with four wins.

In 2017, the Colombian Women's Football League was founded. Santa Fe was the winner of the first edition.

International
The Colombia national team made their first appearance in 1938 and since then have enjoyed both highs and lows.

Copa América
Colombia did not enter the Copa América until the 1945 tournament when they finished fifth out of seven countries. Their participation was sporadic until 1975, a tournament in which they finished as runners-up, since when they have been ever-present. Colombia hosted the 2001 Copa América and registered to date their only win in the competition, defeating Mexico 1–0 in the final.

World Cup
Colombia first entered the FIFA World Cup in 1938 but withdrew from the qualification tournament. They qualified for the 1962 finals but were eliminated in the first round. They returned to the tournament in 1990 and reached the second round with a team featuring the likes of Carlos Valderrama, Freddy Rincón and René Higuita.

During qualification for the 1994 FIFA World Cup, Colombia impressed with some exceptional results, not least a 5–0 away win over Argentina, the losing finalists in the previous tournament. Such was their form that Pelé tipped them as possible winners of the whole competition. However, the team were eliminated in the first round after Andrés Escobar scored a notorious own goal, an act for which an irate gambler shot him dead after his return home.

Colombia returned to the competition in 1998 with expectations lowered, and once again they were eliminated in the first round. They did not qualify for a World Cup final again until the 2014 edition, ending a 16-year absence. Colombia has been credited with a new talented golden generation, led by James Rodríguez, who won the Golden Boot for scoring six goals during the tournament as the Colombians reached their first quarter-final in a World Cup. Colombia qualified for the 2018 tournament, and came top of their group to proceed into the Round of 16. They were knocked out of the tournament by England; the game finished 1-1 before England won 4-3 on penalties.

Confederations Cup
As Copa América winners, Colombia were able to take part in the FIFA Confederations Cup held in 2003. They qualified from their group before being eliminated by Cameroon and then losing the third place play-off to Turkey.

Other teams
The Colombian Football Federation runs a number of other teams, notably the under-20s (twice winners at the South American Youth Championship) and the under-17s (who won the South American Under-17 Football Championship in 1993). In 2014, Colombia was one of the eight nations to take part in the first Unity World Cup. It will hold the forthcoming edition of the competition, in 2017.

Club football
Two Colombian clubs have won the Copa Libertadores, leading Medellín club Atlético Nacional in 1989 and 2016 and little-fancied Once Caldas who triumphed in 2004, whilst Santa Fe became the first Colombian winners of the Copa Sudamericana in 2015. These are the only victories in any major international club tournament by Colombian sides.

Football in Colombian culture 
Prior to 1980s, Colombia national football team was widely recognized as a weak team, and lack of fans, due to neglected investment for the national team by the Colombian Football Federation, national tragedies like La Violencia, and widespread criminal activities that destabilised the country. Their lack of participation also added for this sporadic support, and despite having qualified for the 1962 FIFA World Cup, Colombian team remained underrated and under-achieved than the rest of South America, particularly to those of Chile, Peru, Bolivia and Paraguay outside traditional powers Uruguay, Brazil and Argentina, in spite of their youth football successes.

Since the mid-1980s, with the influx of drug money into football, a new generation of football stars emerged, with René Higuita, Faustino Asprilla, Carlos Valderrama, Andrés Escobar and Arnoldo Iguarán. Following with it, the national team has become a symbol fighting the country's negative reputation. This has made the sport popular and made the national team a sign of nationalism, pride and passion for many Colombians worldwide. Colombia is known for having a passionate fan base, often attend in large number whatever the national team of Colombia play elsewhere.

+40,000-capacity Colombian football venues

See also 
1918 Campeonato Nacional
Bestiario del balón
Categoría Primera A
Categoría Primera B
Colombian football league system
Copa Colombia
Superliga Colombiana

Notes

References